Canepina is a  (municipality) in the Province of Viterbo in the Italian region of Latium, located about  northwest of Rome and about  southeast of Viterbo.

References

Cities and towns in Lazio